Eriodictyon angustifolium, common name narrowleaf yerba santa, is a perennial shrub.

The plant is native to pinyon-juniper woodland habits of western North American deserts. It is found in the Mojave Desert in California, Nevada, & Utah; and in Baja California.

Description
Eriodictyon angustifolium has toothed leaves, about 10 centimeters in length, that are sticky above and hairy below.

The white, five-petaled flowers are in bloom in June &/or July.

Distribution 
In Baja California, this plant is found growing in the foothills of the Sierra de Juarez and the Sierra de San Pedro Martir, but it can be found growing further south on the sky islands of the Sierra de la Asamblea and the Sierra de San Borja.

Uses 
Eriodictyon angustifolium extract, but not Eriodictyon californicum extract, reduces human hair greying. Sterubin is the most abundant flavonoid in Eriodictyon angustifolium extract.

Dietary eriodictyon angustifolium tea supports prevention of hair graying by reducing DNA damage in CD34+ hair follicular keratinocyte stem cells.

References

External links 
 Calflora Database: Eriodictyon angustifolium (Narrow leaved yerba santa,  Narrowleaf yerba santa) 
 Jepson Manual eFlora treatment of Eriodictyon angustifolium
 UC CalPhotos gallery of Eriodictyon angustifolium

angustifolium
Flora of the California desert regions
Flora of Baja California
Flora of Utah
Flora of Nevada
Natural history of the Mojave Desert
Taxa named by Thomas Nuttall
Flora without expected TNC conservation status